Northampton Lumber Company Historic District is a historic saw mill and building supply store complex and national historic district located at Nassawadox, Northampton County, Virginia. The district encompasses seven contributing buildings and three contributing structures.  They are the retail store (c. 1887), water tower (c. 1887), saw mill (c. 1887), potato shed, barn (c. 1912), 1940s shed, two lumber sheds, and two sets of New York, Pennsylvania, & Norfolk Railroad tracks. The Northampton Lumber Company has been an integral part of the history and livelihood of Nassawadox for
over a century.

It was listed on the National Register of Historic Places in 2008.

References

Industrial buildings and structures on the National Register of Historic Places in Virginia
Historic districts in Northampton County, Virginia
National Register of Historic Places in Northampton County, Virginia
Historic districts on the National Register of Historic Places in Virginia
U.S. Route 13
1887 establishments in Virginia